This is a list of the Sweden national football team results from 1980 to 1989.

1980

1981

1982

1983

1984

1985

1986

1987

1988

1989

Appearances

External links
Results at RSSSF 

1980s in Sweden
1980s